Adventures in the Magic Kingdom is a video game released on June 1, 1990 for the Nintendo Entertainment System. Its soundtrack was composed by Yoko Shimomura.  The game was released in five different regions (British Isles, North America, France, Scandinavia, and Australasia), using three different retail covers. The game places the player as a nameless main character, for whom the player can enter a name at the start of the game, into a hub-and-spoke Disney park heavily based on the company's Disneyland, Magic Kingdom, and Tokyo Disneyland parks. Goofy left the golden key for the castle gate inside, and Mickey Mouse asks for the player's help to find six silver keys needed to open the Cinderella Castle gate and allow the Disney parade to begin. After completing this task, Mickey congratulates the player and the parade begins.

Gameplay

The player must complete five different stages, modeled after rides in Disney theme parks, as well as a trivia quest in order to retrieve the set of keys. The player chooses which stage to play by walking around the park in the game's overworld map.

The game features two vehicle stages with a top-down perspective. One of these stages is based on the Autopia ride and is a driving game in which the player must avoid various obstacles in a race against the villainous Panhandle Pete. The second, based on Big Thunder Mountain Railroad has the player controlling a train on a track and having to choose the right path to take while avoiding obstacles.

There are also two side scrolling stages. In the Haunted Mansion stage, the player must defeat ghosts by throwing candles at them to retrieve one of the keys. The other side-scrolling stage is based on Pirates of the Caribbean and the player must rescue six villagers from pirates who have raided an island.

The Space Mountain stage is a first-person stage in which the player boards a spaceship with the mission to reach a certain star, maneuvering through asteroids while shooting enemy ships with a phaser. The trivia game is available to play at any time. Several children around the park ask the player questions about Disney films and characters; if these are answered correctly, the children will reveal the location of the final silver key.

Reception
Total! Magazine gave the game an overall score of 44 out of 100 criticizing the game being unoriginal, having many glitches, easy gameplay that is boring with terrible collision detection concluding "Mickey's no Mario in this collection of sub-standard sub-games with a flimsy Disney connection".

See also
Kinect: Disneyland Adventures
List of Disney video games

References

External links
Disney Adventures in the Magic Kingdom at MobyGames
Adventures In The Magic Kingdom Prototype   http://www.nintendoplayer.com/magickingdom/prototype.htm
Interview with Producer: Darlene Lacey   http://www.nintendoplayer.com/interview/former-disney-game-producer-darlene-lacey/

1990 video games
Disney games by Capcom
Magic Kingdom
Nintendo Entertainment System games
Nintendo Entertainment System-only games
Pirates of the Caribbean video games
The Haunted Mansion video games
Video games based on Walt Disney Parks and Resorts attractions
Video games set in Orlando, Florida
Walt Disney World in fiction
Video games scored by Yoko Shimomura
Video games developed in Japan
Video games set in amusement parks